Sega Race TV is a racing game for the Sega Lindbergh arcade system board. It was released on February 19, 2008 in Japan, July 4, 2008 in the US and on March 13, 2009 in Europe.

Featured cars
The eight cars featured in the game are Ford Mustang GT, Chevrolet Camaro Concept, Chevrolet Corvette C3 Stingray, Plymouth HEMI Cuda, Mazda MX-5, Mitsubishi Eclipse, Ruf RK Roadster, Plymouth Prowler and Mercury Convertible, all exist in convertible forms. All can be customized, and customized cars can be obtained through passwords in an arcade cabinet.

Development
This was the only game Yu Suzuki was successfully able to complete after his departure from Sega AM2, the other two projects that he worked on Psy-Phi and Shenmue Online were never released.
Sega Race TV was Suzuki's last game with Sega, after which he established his own studio YS.NET and subsequently retired from the company.

References

External links
 Official website
 Sega Race TV at GameFAQs

2008 video games
Racing video games
Arcade video games
Arcade-only video games
Sega arcade games
Video games developed in Japan